The Ethiopian Addis Kidan Baptist Church is a Baptist Christian denomination in Ethiopia. It is affiliated with the Baptist World Alliance. The headquarters is in Addis Ababa.

History
The Ethiopian Addis Kidan Baptist Church has its origins in an American mission of the International Mission Board in 1965.  It is officially founded in 1989.  According to a denomination census released in 2020, it claimed 147 churches and 42,270 members.

See also 
 Bible
 Born again
 Baptist beliefs
 Worship service (evangelicalism)
 Jesus Christ
 Believers' Church

References

External links
 Official Website

Baptist denominations in Africa
Evangelicalism in Ethiopia
1989 establishments in Ethiopia